Harry Wendell Reeves (December 3, 1910 – February 5, 2001) was an American sports shooter. He competed in the 50 m pistol event at the 1952 Summer Olympics.

References

1910 births
2001 deaths
American male sport shooters
Olympic shooters of the United States
Shooters at the 1952 Summer Olympics
People from Knox County, Indiana
Sportspeople from Indiana